Análise Social (Social Analysis) is a Portuguese peer-reviewed academic journal of social science, published quarterly since 1963 by the Social Sciences Institute of the University of Lisbon. It is specialized in the fields of anthropology, history, political science and sociology. Starting in 2009, it also publishes articles in English.

External links
  

Publications established in 1963
Multidisciplinary social science journals
Multilingual journals
English-language journals
Portuguese-language journals
Quarterly journals
University of Lisbon
1963 establishments in Portugal